The Peshawar Zalmi (often abbreviated as PZ) is a franchise cricket team that represents Peshawar, Khyber Pakhtunkhwa, Pakistan in the Pakistan Super League (PSL). The franchise won the tournament in 2017. The team was coached by Daren Sammy, and captained by Wahab Riaz.

Season standings

Points table

League fixtures

Playoffs

Eliminator 1

Eliminator 2

Final

References

External links 
 Team records in 2021 at ESPNcricinfo

2022 Pakistan Super League
2021 in Pakistani cricket
2021